The Sri Lanka Ranjana is a national honour of Sri Lanka for foreigners or non nationals, awarded "for distinguished service of highly meritorious nature".

Awardees
Awardees include:

2005
 Baik Sung-hak 
 Evert Jongens
 Geoffrey Dobbs
 Monica De Decker-Deprez
 Raja Tridiv Roy
 Robert Woods
 Romesh Gunesekera
 Sung Woan-jong
 Tadashi Noguchi
 Wang Shihong
 Wolfgang Stange

2017 
 Sarath Gunapala
 Siddhartha Kaul

References

External links

 
Civil awards and decorations of Sri Lanka